11i is the third studio album by Supreme Beings of Leisure. It was released in 2008.

Track listing
"The Light" – 4:48
"This World" – 3:26
"Mirror" – 5:11
"Swallow" – 4:48
"Good" – 4:04
"Pieces" – 4:07
"Angelhead" (featuring Lili Haydn) – 4:49
"Ride" – 5:07
"Oneness" (featuring Marty Friedman) – 3:01
"Everywhere" – 5:06
"Lay Me Down" – 8:18

References

External links
11i at Discogs

2008 albums
Rykodisc albums
Supreme Beings of Leisure albums